General  was the founder of a collateral branch of the Japanese imperial family and a general in the Imperial Japanese Army during the Japanese invasion of China and the Second World War. Son-in-law of Emperor Meiji and uncle by marriage of Emperor Hirohito, Prince Asaka was commander of Japanese forces in the final assault on Nanjing, then the capital city of Nationalist China, in December 1937. Japanese forces under his command committed the Nanjing massacre.

After the war, General Douglas MacArthur granted immunity to members of the Imperial family. As a result, Asaka was never tried for his involvement in the Nanjing Massacre by SCAP authorities. Asaka and his children lost their imperial status in 1947. Afterwards, he converted to Catholicism and died of natural causes at the age of 93.

Biography

Early years
Prince Yasuhiko came from Kyoto, the eighth son of Prince Kuni Asahiko and the court lady Tsunoda Sugako. Prince Kuni Asahiko was the youngest prince descended from the Fushimi-no-miya, one of the four branch houses of the imperial dynasty (shinnōke) entitled to provide a successor to the throne. In 1872, the Emperor Meiji granted him the title Kuni-no-miya and authorization to begin a new collateral branch of the imperial family. Prince Yasuhiko was a half-brother of Prince Higashikuni Naruhiko, Prince Nashimoto Morimasa, Prince Kaya Kuninori, and Prince Kuni Kuniyoshi, the father of the future Empress Kōjun, the consort of Emperor Shōwa (Hirohito).

Marriage and family 
On 10 March 1906, the Emperor Meiji granted Prince Yasuhiko the title Asaka-no-miya and authorization to begin a new branch of the imperial family. On 6 May 1909, Prince Asaka married Nobuko, Princess Fumi (7 August 1891 – 3 November 1933), the eighth daughter of Emperor Meiji. Prince and Princess Asaka had four children:

 ; married in 1931 Marquis Nabeshima Naoyasu.
 ; married Todo Chikako, the fifth daughter of Count Todo Takatsugu. They had two daughters, Fukuko and Minoko and a son Tomohiko.
 , renounced membership in the imperial family and created Marquis Otowa, 1936. Killed in action during the Battle of Kwajalein.
 ; married Count Ogyu Yoshiatsu.

Military career
Like the other imperial princes of the Meiji period, it was expected that Prince Yasuhiko would pursue a career in the military. He received his early education at the Gakushūin Peers' School and the Central Military Preparatory School, before graduating from the Imperial Japanese Army Academy on 27 May 1908. Commissioned a second lieutenant of infantry on 25 December, Prince Asaka was promoted to lieutenant in December 1910, captain in August 1913, major in July 1918, and lieutenant-colonel in August 1922.

Between 1920 and 1923, Prince Asaka studied military tactics at the École spéciale militaire de Saint-Cyr in France, along with his half-brother Prince Naruhiko Higashikuni and his cousin Prince Naruhisa Kitashirakawa (1887–1923). However, on 1 April 1923, he was seriously injured in an automobile accident in Perriers-la-Campagne (Normandy) that killed Prince Kitashirakawa; the accident left Prince Asaka with a limp for the rest of his life.

Princess Asaka traveled to France to nurse her husband. Prince and Princess Asaka also visited the United States in 1925. During that period, Prince and Princess Asaka became enthralled with the Art Deco movement. Upon returning to Japan that same year, The Prince and Princess began arranging for a new mansion to be built in the Art Deco style in Tokyo's Shirokanedai neighborhood. The house, currently the Tokyo Metropolitan Teien Art Museum, was completed in May 1933, but Princess Asaka died a few months later.

While these events were occurring, Prince Asaka had risen through the ranks of the military. After being promoted to the rank of colonel in August 1925, in December 1929, he rose to the rank of major general and was subsequently appointed an instructor at the Army Staff College in 1930. On 1 August 1933, he was promoted to lieutenant general and assumed command of the First Imperial Guards Division. In December 1935, he was appointed a member of the Supreme War Council, which gave him a very influential position with Emperor Hirohito.

However, during the abortive February 26 Incident in 1936, Prince Asaka pressed the Emperor to appoint a new government that would be acceptable to the rebels, especially by replacing Prime Minister Keisuke Okada with Kōki Hirota. The Prince's pro-Imperial Way Faction political sentiments, as well as his connections to other right-wing army cliques, caused a rift between himself and the Emperor. It was perhaps due to this rift that Prince Asaka was transferred to the Japanese Central China Area Army (under the aging General Iwane Matsui) in China in 1937.

Role in the Nanjing Massacre

In November 1937, Prince Asaka became temporary commander of the Japanese forces outside Nanjing, then capital of China, because General Matsui was ill. As temporary commander of the final assault on Nanjing between 2 and 6 December 1937, he issued the order to "kill all captives", thus providing official sanction for what became known as the "Nanjing Massacre" or the "Rape of Nanjing" (12 December 1937 – 10 February 1938).

While Prince Asaka's responsibility for the Nanjing Massacre remains a matter of debate, the sanction for the massacre and the crimes committed during the invasion of China might ultimately be found in the ratification, made on 5 August 1937 by Emperor Hirohito, of the proposition of the Japanese army to remove the constraints of international law on the treatment of Chinese prisoners.

In February 1938, both Prince Asaka and General Matsui were recalled to Japan. Matsui went into virtual retirement, but Prince Asaka remained on the Supreme War Council until the end of the war in August 1945. He was promoted to the rank of general in August 1939 but held no further military commands. In 1944, he colluded with Prince Higashikuni, his nephew Prince Takamatsu, and former Prime Minister Fumimaro Konoe (1895–1945) to oust the Hideki Tojo cabinet.

Immunity from prosecution
Supreme Commander of the Allied Powers (SCAP) officials interrogated Prince Asaka about his involvement in the Nanjing Massacre on 1 May 1946, but did not bring him before the International Military Tribunal for the Far East for prosecution. Indeed, for politico-strategic and geopolitical reasons, General Douglas MacArthur decided to support the Imperial family and to grant immunity to all its members. Matsui, on the other hand, was tried, convicted, and executed for failing to prevent the massacre.

Postwar life as a commoner
On 14 October 1947, Asaka Yasuhiko and his children lost their imperial status and privileges and became ordinary citizens, as part of the American Occupation's abolition of the collateral branches of the Japanese Imperial family. He and his son were purged from holding any political or public office because they had been officers in the Imperial Japanese Army. His Art Deco mansion in Shirokanedai was seized by the government and now houses the Tokyo Metropolitan Teien Art Museum.

The former prince, Asaka Yasuhiko, moved to Atami, on the Izu Peninsula south of Tokyo. Asaka converted to Catholicism on 18 December 1951, and he was the first Imperial clansman to do so. He spent most of his time playing golf. He also took an active interest in golf course development and in the 1950s was the architect of the Plateau Golf Course at the Dai-Hakone Country Club. Asaka Yasuhiko died of natural causes on 12 April 1981 at his home in Atami, Shizuoka prefecture. He was 93 years old.

Honours 
 Grand Cordon of the Order of the Chrysanthemum (31 October 1917)
 Order of the Golden Kite, 1st Class (4 April 1942)

Foreign honours 
  : Grand Cordon Order of Leopold (29 April 1925)

Gallery

References

Books

External links 
 Profile of Asaka
 About this museum – Tokyo Metropolitan Teien Art Museum

1887 births
1981 deaths
People from Kyoto
Japanese princes
Asaka-no-miya
École Spéciale Militaire de Saint-Cyr alumni
Recipients of the Order of the Golden Kite
Japanese generals
Imperial Japanese Army generals of World War II
Imperial Japanese Army personnel of World War II
Japanese Roman Catholics
Converts to Roman Catholicism from Shinto
Nanjing Massacre perpetrators